Cedar Grove is an unincorporated community in Rutherford County, Tennessee, United States.

References

Unincorporated communities in Rutherford County, Tennessee
Unincorporated communities in Tennessee